Mesosemia is a genus in the butterfly family Riodinidae present only in the Neotropical realm.

This genus rather closely approximates the genus Eurybia, though it is by no means so uniform. Also here there is in most of the species almost exactly above the middle of the forewing a large eyespot which often exhibits two or three white pupils, and where it is absent, one mostly finds yet its traces in the shape of a small central shade or minute cloud. The Mesosemia differ from the Eurybia by their smaller heads, the shorter antennae, the borders of the forewings being generally slightly curved, the short abdomen mostly not reaching as far as the anal angle, the longer hindwings being often geniculate (knee like) in the middle of the distal margin, or angularly protended (held out). The row of distal marginal spots of the hindwing is always absent, the hindwings, however, show in the disk more or less parallel transverse stripes. The sexual dimorphism, which is not noticed in Eurybia is here the rule and mostly very much pronounced. The butterflies are often met with on blossoms, still oftener on leaves, but they seem to rest much on their under surface in order to come forth only for a short time for the sake of copulation and feeding. Then they perform jerky movements on the leaves, stretching the antennae straight forward, placing the hindwings flat on the leaf and slightly raising the forewings. In this manner they hasten from one leaf to another, from one branch to another, more jumping than flying, as Fassl expresses himself. The butterflies are partly extremely local and some of them are very rare.

Species 
Mesosemia ackeryi Brévignon, 1997 present in French Guiana
Mesosemia acuta Hewitson, 1873 present in Brazil
Mesosemia adida Hewitson, 1869 present in Ecuador
Mesosemia ahava Hewitson, 1869 present in Ecuador, Bolivia and Peru
Mesosemia albipuncta Schaus, 1913 present in Costa Rica and Panama
Mesosemia amarantus Stichel, 1910 present in Peru
Mesosemia anceps Stichel, 1915 present in Ecuador
Mesosemia antaerice Hewitson, 1859 present in French Guiana, Guyana, Suriname, Trinidad and Tobago, Ecuador and Brazil 
Mesosemia araeostyla Stichel, 1915 present in Guyana
Mesosemia asa Hewitson, 1869 present in Costa Rica, Nicaragua, Panama, Ecuador and Colombia
Mesosemia bahia Callaghan, 1999 present in Brazil
Mesosemia bella Sharpe, 1890 present in Brazil
Mesosemia carderi Druce, 1904 present in Colombia
Mesosemia carissima Bates, 1866 present in Costa Rica and Panama
Mesosemia ceropia Druce, 1874 present in Costa Rica and Colombia
Mesosemia coelestis Godman & Salvin, [1885] present in Costa Rica and Colombia
Mesosemia cordillerrensis Salazar & Constantino, 1993 present in Colombia
Mesosemia cyanira Stichel, 1909 present in Ecuador
Mesosemia cippus Hewitson, 1859 present in Brazil
Mesosemia cymotaxis Stichel, 1910 present in Brazil
Mesosemia decolorata Lathy, 1932 present in Brazil and French Guiana
Mesosemia dulcis Stichel, 1910 present in Brazil
Mesosemia ephyne (Cramer, 1776) present in French Guiana, French Guiana, Suriname, Peru and Brazil 
Mesosemia epidius Hewitson, 1859 present in French Guiana
Mesosemia erinnya Stichel, 1910 Ecuador and Peru.
Mesosemia esmeralda Gallard & Brévignon, 1989 present in French Guiana
Mesosemia esperanza Schaus, 1913 present in Costa Rica and Panama
Mesosemia eugenea Stichel, 1910 present in Suriname and Brazil
Mesosemia eumene (Cramer, 1776) present in French Guiana, French Guiana, Suriname, Ecuador, Bolivia Peru and Brazil 
Mesosemia eurythmia Stichel, 1915 present in Brazil
Mesosemia evias Stichel, 1923 present in Brazil
Mesosemia friburgensis Schaus, 1902 present in Brazil
Mesosemia gaudiolum Bates, 1865 Mexico, Nicaragua and Guatemala
Mesosemia gemina J. & R. G. Maza, 1980 present in Mexico
Mesosemia gertraudis Stichel, 1910 present in Peru
Mesosemia gneris Westwood, 1851 present in Suriname, Peru and Brazil
Mesosemia grandis Druce, 1874 present in Costa Rica and Panama
Mesosemia harveyi DeVries & Hall, 1996 present in Costa Rica and Panama
Mesosemia hedwigis Stichel, 1910 present in Peru and Bolivia
Mesosemia hesperina Butler, 1874 present in Costa Rica, Nicaragua, Venezuela and Brazil
Mesosemia hypermegala Stichel, 1909 present in Costa Rica and Colombia
Mesosemia jucunda Stichel, 1923 present in Brazil
Mesosemia ibycus Hewitson, 1859
Mesosemia impedita Stichel, 1909 present in Brazil
Mesosemia inconspicua Lathy, 1932 present in French Guiana
Mesosemia isshia Butler, 1869 present in Colombia
Mesosemia judicialis Butler, 1874 present in Brazil, Bolivia and Peru.
Mesosemia kwokii D'Abrera, 1860 present in Colombia
Mesosemia lacernata Stichel, 1909 present in Suriname
Mesosemia lamachus Hewitson, 1857 present in Mexico, Honduras, Costa Rica, Guatemala and Colombia
Mesosemia lapillus Stichel, 1910 present in Peru
Mesosemia latizonata Butler, 1874 present in Ecuador 
Mesosemia loruhama Hewitson, 1869 present in Ecuador, Colombia, Bolivia and Peru.
Mesosemia luperca Stichel, 1910 present in Peru
Mesosemia lycorias Stichel, 1915 present in Brazil
Mesosemia macella Hewitson, 1859 present in Brazil
Mesosemia machaera Hewitson, 1860 present in Ecuador, Brazil and Colombia 
Mesosemia macrina (C. & R. Felder, 1865) present in Ecuador and Colombia 
Mesosemia maeotis Hewitson, 1859 present in Brazil
Mesosemia magete Hewitson, 1860 present in Suriname and Brazil
Mesosemia mamilia Hewitson, 1870 present in Ecuador
Mesosemia mancia Hewitson, 1870 present in Ecuador
Mesosemia mathania Schaus, 1902 present in Peru
Mesosemia mayi Lathy, 1958 present in Brazil
Mesosemia meeda Hewitson, 1858 present in Brazil
Mesosemia melaene Hewitson, 1859 present in Brazil French Guiana
Mesosemia melese Hewitson, 1860 present in Brazil
Mesosemia melpia Hewitson, 1859 present in Brazil
Mesosemia menoetes Hewitson, 1859 present in French Guiana, Bolivia, Peru and Brazil 
Mesosemia messeis Hewitson, 1860 present in Ecuador, Brazil, Bolivia and Peru
Mesosemia mesoba Hewitson, [1873] present in Ecuador
Mesosemia methion Hewitson, 1860 present in Brazil and Trinidad and Tobago
Mesosemia metope Hewitson, 1859 present in French Guiana, Guyana, Peru and Brazil 
Mesosemia mehida Hewitson, 1869 present in Ecuador
Mesosemia mevania Hewitson, [1857] present in Ecuador, Peru and Colombia 
Mesosemia metuana (C. & R. Felder, 1865) present in Ecuador, Colombia and Bolivia
Mesosemia metura Hewitson, [1873] present in Peru
Mesosemia minos Hewitson, 1859 present in Suriname and Brazil
Mesosemia minutula Gallard, 1996 present in French Guiana
Mesosemia misipsa Hewitson, 1859 Brazil
Mesosemia modulata Stichel, 1910 present in Peru
Mesosemia moesia Hewitson, [1857] present in Brazil
Mesosemia mosera Hewitson, 1860 present in Brazil
Mesosemia myonia Hewitson, 1859 present in Brazil
Mesosemia myrmecias Stichel, 1910 present in French Guiana, Guyana, Peru and Bolivia
Mesosemia naiadella Stichel, 1909 present in French Guiana, Guyana, Suriname, Ecuador, Peru and Brazil
Mesosemia nerine Stichel, 1909 present in Bolivia
Mesosemia nyctea (Hoffmannsegg, 1818) present in Suriname and Brazil
Mesosemia nympharena Stichel, 1909 present in French Guiana
Mesosemia odice (Godart, [1824]) present in Brazil and Argentina
Mesosemia olivencia Bates, 1868 present in Peru and Brazil
Mesosemia orbona Godman, 1903 present in French Guiana, Guyana, Suriname and Colombia 
Mesosemia ozora Hewitson, 1869 present in Ecuador
Mesosemia pacifica Stichel, 1926 present in Colombia
Mesosemia pardalis Callaghan, 2001 present in Brazil
Mesosemia phace Godman, 1903 present in Guyana
Mesosemia philocles (Linnaeus, 1758) present in Suriname and Brazil
Mesosemia praeculta Stichel, 1910 present in Bolivia
Mesosemia putli Seitz, 1913 present in Peru
Mesosemia reba Hewitson, 1869 present in Ecuador
Mesosemia rhodia (Godart, [1824] present in Brazil)
Mesosemia scotina Stichel, 1909 present in Suriname
Mesosemia sibyllina Staudinger, [1887] present in Ecuador and Colombia 
Mesosemia sifia (Boisduval, 1836) present in French Guiana, Guyana, Ecuador and Colombia 
Mesosemia sirenia Stichel, 1909 present in Brazil, Bolivia and Peru
Mesosemia steli Hewitson, 1858 present in Brazil
Mesosemia subtilis Stichel, 1909 present in Bolivia and Peru
Mesosemia synnephis Stichel, 1909 present in Brazil
Mesosemia telegone (Boisduval, [1836]) present in Mexico, Costa Rica, Venezuela, Ecuador and Colombia
Mesosemia tenebricosa Hewitson, 1877 present in Brazil, Ecuador and Peru
Mesosemia teulem Brévignon, 1995 present in French Guiana
Mesosemia thera Godman, 1903 present in Brazil
Mesosemia thetys Godman & Salvin, [1885] present in Colombia
Mesosemia thyas Stichel, 1910 present in Brazil
Mesosemia thymetus (Cramer, 1777) present in Suriname and Colombia
Mesosemia ulrica (Cramer, 1777) present in Suriname, Ecuador and Peru
Mesosemia veneris Butler, 1871 present in Brazil
Mesosemia zanoa Hewitson, 1869 present in Ecuador and Colombia 
Mesosemia zikla Hewitson, 1869 present in Ecuador
Mesosemia zonalis Godman & Salvin, [1885] present in Honduras and Panama
Mesosemia zorea Hewitson, 1869 present in Ecuador, Colombia and Peru
Mesosemia walteri Brévignon, 1998 present in French Guiana

Sources 

funet

External links 

Mesosemia at Butterflies of America

Riodinidae
Riodinidae of South America
Butterfly genera
Taxa named by Jacob Hübner